Hernán Nicolás Da Campo (born 6 August 1994) is an Argentine professional footballer who plays as a right midfielder for Brown de Adrogué.

Career
Rosario Central promoted Da Campo into their first-team squad in late-2014, awarding him a professional debut on 22 November for a 1–1 Argentine Primera División draw with Olimpo. He followed that up with four appearances in all competitions across his first three seasons, including his Copa Libertadores debut versus Palmeiras in March 2016. Four months later, Da Campo joined fellow Primera División team Quilmes on loan for 2016–17. Quilmes ended the league campaign with relegation, but Da Campo featured twenty-four times and scored three goals; the first coming against Boca Juniors at La Bombonera.

A loan move to San Martín was completed on 24 June 2018. Nine total appearances followed as they suffered relegation. Da Campo left Rosario permanently in July 2019 in order to sign for Chacarita Juniors of Primera B Nacional. He featured thirteen times in 2019–20, with his final match for the club occurring on 16 March 2020 against Almagro; in a campaign that was curtailed due to the COVID-19 pandemic. On 21 August 2020, Da Campo joined Football League Greece side Olympiacos Volos. On 3 February 2021, with the league still unable to start, Da Campo was loaned to Super League 2 with Apollon Larissa. He left Greece in July 2021.

Ahead of the 2022 season, Da Campo officially signed with Primera Nacional side Brown de Adrogué.

Career statistics
.

References

External links

1994 births
Living people
Argentine footballers
Argentine expatriate footballers
People from San Lorenzo Department
Association football midfielders
Sportspeople from Santa Fe Province
Argentine Primera División players
Primera Nacional players
Rosario Central footballers
Quilmes Atlético Club footballers
San Martín de San Juan footballers
Chacarita Juniors footballers
Olympiacos Volos F.C. players
Apollon Larissa F.C. players
Club Atlético Brown footballers
Expatriate footballers in Greece
Argentine expatriate sportspeople in Greece